Arthrobotrya is a genus of ferns in the family Dryopteridaceae, subfamily Elaphoglossoideae, in the Pteridophyte Phylogeny Group classification of 2016 (PPG I). The genus is native to Australia and New Zealand.

Taxonomy
Arthrobotrya was first described by John Smith in 1875. The genus is recognized in the PPG I classification, and by the Checklist of Ferns and Lycophytes of the World. Plants of the World Online sinks the genus into Teratophyllum.

Species
, the Checklist of Ferns and Lycophytes of the World recognized the following species:
Arthrobotrya articulata (J.Sm. ex Fée) J.Sm.
Arthrobotrya brightiae (F.Muell.) Pic.Serm.
Arthrobotrya wilkesiana (Brack.) Copel.

References

Dryopteridaceae
Fern genera